Kitasatospora cinereorecta is a bacterium species from the genus Kitasatospora.

References

Further reading

External links
Type strain of Streptomyces cinereorectus at BacDive -  the Bacterial Diversity Metadatabase

Streptomycineae
Bacteria described in 1986